The 1971 Toronto Argonauts finished in first place in the Eastern Conference with a 10–4 record. They appeared in the Grey Cup.

Offseason

Regular season

Standings

Schedule

Postseason

Grey Cup

Awards and honors
Annis Stukus Trophy – Leo Cahill
1971 CFL All-Stars, RB – Leon McQuay
1971 CFL All-Stars, TE – Mel Profit

References

Toronto Argonauts seasons
James S. Dixon Trophy championship seasons
1971 Canadian Football League season by team